30 Miles from Nowhere is a 2018 American horror film directed by Caitlin Koller and starring Carrie Preston.

Plot
The film follows five ex-college buddies who return to the summer home of their youth for their scientist friend's funeral. But mourning turns to terror when they realize their reunion is not at all what it seems.

Cast
Carrie Preston as Sylvia
Rob Benedict as Larry
Cathy Shim as Bess
Seana Kofoed as Elaine
William Smillie as Paul
Postell Pringle as Jack
Marielle Scott as Amber
Andrew Rothenberg as Max
Rusty Schwimmer as Officer Marsh
Roslyn Alexander as Norma
Reggie Baker as Officer Riley
Robert Breuler as Father Galvin

Reception

References

External links
 
 

2018 films
American horror films
2018 horror films
2010s English-language films
2010s American films